The 2017 GSOC Tour Challenge was held from September 5 to 10 at the Co-operators Centre at Evraz Place in Regina, Saskatchewan. This was the first Grand Slam of the 2017–18 curling season.

There were two tiers in each of the men's and women's events.

The winning tier 1 teams get a direct bye into the 2018 Humpty's Champions Cup, the last grand slam event of the season. The winning tier 2 teams get a bye into the 2017 Masters, the next grand slam event of the season.

On the men's side, the defending World Champion Brad Gushue rink from St. John's, Newfoundland defeated the defending Norwegian champion Steffen Walstad rink in the final. It would be Gushue's 8th career grand slam win. Team Gushue went undefeated in the tournament and took home $20,000 for the win.

On the women's side, the defending Tour Challenge champion Val Sweeting from Edmonton, Alberta rink made it two in a row when they defeated the Swedish Anna Hasselborg rink in the final, also taking home $20,000. It was Sweeting's third career Slam title.

Men

Tier 1

Teams

Round-robin standings

Playoffs

Quarterfinals
Saturday, Sept 9, 3:30pm

Semifinals
Saturday, Sept 9, 8:00pm

Final
Sunday, Sept 10, 10:30am

Tier 2

Round-robin standings

Playoffs

Women

Tier 1

Teams

Round-robin standings

Tiebreaker

Playoffs

Quarterfinals
Saturday, Sept 9, 11:30am

Semifinals
Saturday, Sept. 9, 8:00pm

Final
Sunday, Sept 10, 2:30pm

Tier 2

Round-robin standings

Tiebreakers
 Silvernagle 5-4 Martin 
 Kim 5-6 Rocque 
 Fleming 5-6 Lawton 
 Scotland 5-7 Silvernagle

Playoffs

Notes

References

External links

GSOC Tour Challenge
2017 in Canadian curling
Sports competitions in Regina, Saskatchewan
Curling in Saskatchewan
2017 in Saskatchewan
Tour Challenge